Savennières is a commune in the Maine-et-Loire department in western France.

With production predominantly centred on the Chenin blanc grape, it is famed for its particularly long-lasting dry white wine comparable to that of Vouvray.

Savennières wine

The area around Savennières is used for the production of white wine from Chenin blanc grapes. The wines are mostly dry, often produced in a powerful style, and the best examples (such as those produced by Nicolas Joly's Château de la Roche aux Moines) are highly regarded by international wine critics. The Savennières Appellation d'Origine Controlée (AOC) spreads over 3 hills of schist, located on the right (northwest) bank of the Loire river, totaling about 300 hectares, of which about half are currently in production.

See also
French wine

References

External links

 Official website

Communes of Maine-et-Loire